Hassan Benjelloun (born April 12, 1950) is a Moroccan screenwriter, director and producer. He is best known for his 2007 comedy Where Are You Going Moshé? (Où vas-tu Moshé?).

Biography 
Benjelloun was born in Settat. He was born in a family of ten children in 1950. In 1965, he studied science at Abdelmalek Essaadi High School in Kénitra. He attended the Abdelmalek Essaadi high school in Kenitra before passing his baccalaureate in Caen where he continued his studies, pursuing postgraduate studies in pharmacy. He graduated in 1976 and worked at the Faculty of Medicine in Casablanca. In 1979, He passed his bachelor's degree in Caen where he continued by studying pharmacy from which he graduated in 1976. He decided to open a pharmacy in his native town of Settat. In 1980, he decided to study directing at the Conservatoire libre du cinéma français (CLCF) in Paris where he obtained his diploma.

In 1980, Hassan decided to study directing at the Free Conservatory of French Cinema (CLCF) in Paris where he received his diploma.

In 1983, he directed his first short film "A sense unique"

Upon returning to Morocco, he joined forces with four Moroccan directors to create, in 1989, The Casablanca Group. They would go on to make five feature films, including "La Fête des Autres", Benjelloun's first fiction film.

In 2010, he directed "Les oubliés de l'Histoire". This film was screened at the 11th National Film Festival of Tangier. It was awarded the prize for Best Male Lead for Amine Ennaji's performance.

In July 2019, Benjelloun presided over the jury of the International Feature Film category at the Ecrans Noirs festival.

Awards 
In July 2019, Hassan Benjelloun was nominated as the president of the International Feature Film’s jury of the Cameroonian Festival, Ecrans Noirs 2019

Partial filmography

Feature films 

 1990: La Fête des autres
 1993: Yarit
 1998: Les Amis d'hier
 2001: Jugement d'une femme
 2002: Le Pote
 2004: La Chambre Noire
 2007: Where Are You Going Moshé? (Où vas-tu Moshé?)
 2009: Les Oubliés de l'histoire
 2010: Zmanna
 2011: 5ème corde
 2013: La Lune Rouge

References 

1950 births
Living people
Moroccan screenwriters